Usnu (Quechua for altar / a special platform for important celebrations, also spelled Ushnu) is an archaeological site in Peru.

References 

Archaeological sites in Peru
Archaeological sites in Huánuco Region